Fluffy duck is the name of two different cocktails, both using advocaat as a common ingredient. One cocktail is a smooth, creamy drink based on white rum, and the other is a gin-based highball.

Preparation

References
Salvatore Calabrese: Complete Home Bartender's Guide: 780 Recipes for the Perfect Drink. Sterling Publishing Company 2002, p. 79
Valerie Mellema: The Professional Bartender's Handbook. Atlantic Publishing Company 2007, pp. 175-176

Cocktails with triple sec or curaçao
Cocktails with gin
Cocktails with fruit liqueur
Cocktails with advocaat
Cocktails with light rum